Marco Vitale is an Italian paralympic archer. He won the bronze medal at the Men's team recurve event at the 2008 Summer Paralympics in Beijing.

References

Living people
Italian male archers
Paralympic archers of Italy
Paralympic bronze medalists for Italy
Paralympic medalists in archery
Archers at the 2008 Summer Paralympics
Medalists at the 2008 Summer Paralympics
Year of birth missing (living people)
Place of birth missing (living people)
21st-century Italian people